Olivia Jean Markel White (born February 23, 1990) is an American singer, songwriter, and multi-instrumentalist. She is known as the lead singer and guitarist of the all-female "garage goth" rock band the Black Belles.

Early life 
Jean was raised in St. Clair Shores, Michigan, a suburb of Detroit. Inspired by the Detroit garage rock music scene, Jean began writing and recording music at an early age. Jean received her first guitar at age seven, and began playing multiple instruments in order to record her music. Jean's early recordings consisted mainly of surf-instrumental songs inspired by artist such as Link Wray and Dick Dale.

Career

Jack White and Third Man Records 
Jack White, musician and founder of Third Man Records, discovered Jean after receiving a demo of her recordings at a Dead Weather show in Detroit. In 2009, Jean was invited to record at Third Man in Nashville, Tennessee.

The Black Belles 
Because Jean did not have a band to record with in Nashville, Jack White introduced her to several musicians including Shelby Lynne and Ruby Rogers. The group went into the studio and recorded some original songs including Jean's "What Can I Do?", later released as the first single by the Black Belles. After their success in the studio, the group decided to become a band. Regarding her first recording session in Nashville, Jean stated in an interview, "Once we all met, we kind of collaborated together and shared ideas, threw all those ideas together and we had a lot of material to work with." Jack White signed the Black Belles to Third Man Records and produced a handful of singles, as well as the bands debut self-titled album The Black Belles, released on October 8, 2011. The band saw moderate success with touring; however, in 2012 the band was put on hiatus.

Solo career
The success of the Black Belles led to Jean's career as a solo artist. Her debut solo album, Bathtub Love Killings, was released in 2014 by Third Man. Jean's second solo album, Night Owl was released on August 30, 2019, also on Third Man. Her third album, Raving Ghost, was announced March 2, 2023, with a release date of May 5 by Third Man.

Jean has also performed and recorded with artists as Jack White, Wanda Jackson, and among others.

Personal life
On April 8, 2022, White proposed to Jean near the end of a Supply Chain Issues Tour concert performance at Detroit's Masonic Temple, while "Hotel Yorba" was being played. Jean and White were married shortly afterward by White's business partner Ben Swank, who officiated on stage and was joined by family members.

Discography

Solo

Studio albums 
 Bathtub Love Killings (2014)
 Night Owl (2019)
 Raving Ghost (2023)

EPs 
 Palladium with April March (2020)

with the Black Belles 
Studio albums
 The Black Belles (2011)

References

1990 births
American blues guitarists
Alternative rock guitarists
American women singers
American rock guitarists
American rock singers
21st-century American guitarists
Living people
Lead guitarists
One-man bands
21st-century American singers
Third Man Records artists
American women drummers
Guitarists from Detroit
21st-century American drummers
21st-century American women guitarists